Miss Universe 2011 was the 60th Miss Universe pageant, held at the Credicard Hall in São Paulo, Brazil on September 12, 2011.

At the end of the event, Ximena Navarrete of Mexico crowned Leila Lopes of Angola as Miss Universe 2011. It is the first victory of Angola, and the latest country as of 2023 to win its first crown at the pageant.

Contestants from 89 countries and territories competed in this year's pageant, surpassing the previous record of 86 contestants in 2006. The pageant was hosted by Andy Cohen and Natalie Morales, while Jeannie Mai and Shandi Finnessey provided commentary and analysis throughout the event. Brazilian singer-songwriter Bebel Gilberto and Brazilian pop singer Claudia Leitte performed in this year's pageant.

Background

Location and date 
On December 16, 2010, Donald Trump, owner of the Miss Universe Organization, and Paula Shugart, president of the Miss Universe Organization, announced that the 60th anniversary of the competition will take place in São Paulo, Brazil on September 12, 2011. This came months after Trump negotiated with the media conglomerate Grupo Bandeirantes de Comunicação to host the pageant in São Paulo. According to Joao Carlos Saad, president of Grupo Bandeirantes, the network was pleased that they have reached an agreement with Miss Universe to host the pageant in São Paulo, Brazil. The event aired on NBC in the United States, with a Spanish simulcast on Telemundo.

Selection of participants 
Contestants from 89 countries and territories were selected to compete in the competition. Six of these delegates were appointees to their positions after being a runner-up of their national pageant or being selected through a casting process, while three were selected to replace the original dethroned winner.

Evalina van Putten was appointed to represent Curaçao after Monifa Jansen, Miss Curaçao 2011, did not meet the age requirements. However, Jansen competed in the pageant the following year. Mayra Aldana, the first runner-up of Nuestra Belleza El Salvador 2011, was appointed to represent El Savador after Alejandra Ochoa, Nuestra Belleza Universo 2011, suffered from chronic respiratory illness. Mai Phương Thúy, Miss Vietnam 2006, was supposed to represent Vietnam at Miss Universe. However, Mai refused to participate due to personal reasons and since "Vietnam now has a lot of promising new faces". Due to this, the Ministry of Culture of Vietnam granted the permission to appoint Vũ Thị Hoàng My, the first runner-up of Miss Vietnam 2010, as the representative of Vietnam at Miss Universe.

The 2011 edition saw the returns of the Cayman Islands, Chile, Estonia, Montenegro, Portugal, Saint Lucia, Turks and Caicos Islands, and Vietnam. Portugal last competed in 2002, Chile last competed in 2006, Saint Lucia last competed in 2007, Turks and Caicos last competed in 2008, while the others last competed in 2009. Norway and Zambia withdrew. Sara Nicole Andersen of Norway was crowned ten days after the arrival of contestants in São Paulo. Due to this, Andersen withdrew from the competition. However, Andersen competed in the pageant the following year. Zambia withdrew after its respective organization failed to hold a national competition or appoint a delegate.

Lisa Morgan of Zimbabwe was supposed to compete in the pageant. However, she was not allowed to compete after the Miss Universe Organization denied her participation and went on to compete in Miss International 2011 held in Chengdu, China instead.

Results

Placements

§ - Voted into the Top 16 by viewers

Special awards

Pageant

Format 
The Miss Universe Organization introduced several specific changes to the format for this edition. The results of the preliminary competition— which consisted of the swimsuit and evening gown competition, and the closed-door interview, determined the 15 semifinalists. For the first time in its 60-year history, the organization will implement a pre-pageant fan vote where fans are able to vote for their favorite contestant to automatically advance to the semifinals. This changes the number of semifinalists from 15 to 16. Aside from that, viewers can also rank each contestant during the live pageant.

The top 16 competed in the swimsuit competition and were narrowed down to the top 10 afterward. The top 10 competed in the evening gown competition and were narrowed down to the top 5 afterward. The top 5 competed in the question and answer round and the final look. During the telecast, viewers are able to see on-screen a fan-voting meter which instantly reveals the scores of the contestants from the real-time voting.

Selection committee

Preliminary competition 
 BJ Coleman – President and CEO of Coleman Entertainment Group
 Francesca Romana Diana – Italian jewelry deisgner
 Ana Paula Junqueira – President of the League of Women Voters and United Nations Secretary-General in Brazil
 Scott Lazerson – Philanthropist and former head of the Larry King Foundation
 Matheus Mazzafera – Stylist and reality TV show host
 Jimmy Nguyen – Entertainment and new media lawyer, spokesperson for equal rights and diversity
 Lara Spotts – Vice-President of East Coast Development for the Bravo Network

Final telecast 
 Hélio Castroneves – Brazilian auto racing driver and three-time Indianapolis 500 champion
 Connie Chung – American journalist and TV new broadcaster
 Isabeli Fontana – Brazilian supermodel
 Vivica A. Fox – American actress and television producer
 Adrienne Maloof-Nassif – American businesswoman and television personality
 Lea Salonga – Filipina singer and actress
 Amelia Vega – Miss Universe 2003 from the Dominican Republic

Contestants 
89 contestants competed for the title.

Notes

References

External links

 Official Miss Universe website

2011
2011 beauty pageants
2011 in Brazil
Beauty pageants in Brazil
Events in São Paulo
September 2011 events in South America